Many sports are played by the people in Kerala including both traditional sports and sports from other countries. Association football is the most popular sport in Kerala, followed by cricket. Kerala Blasters are the most supported football club in the whole state and participates in the Indian super league  the top tier of Indian football. Whereas Gokulam Kerala FC a club which plays in the I-league derives most of its support from the Malabar region. However, larger numbers of Keralites also follow sports such as volleyball, hockey, badminton, and kabaddi. There are many large stadiums in Kerala across different cities. Trivandrum city has various sports venues such as Trivandrum International Stadium, Jimmy George Indoor Stadium, University Stadium (Thiruvananthapuram), Chandrasekharan Nair Stadium  and Central Stadium whereas Kochi city has stadiums such as Jawaharlal Nehru International Stadium (Kochi) and Rajiv Gandhi Indoor Stadium. An international astro turf hockey stadium is located at Kollam city. Other major stadiums are EMS Stadium in Kozhikode, Malappuram District Sports Complex Stadium in Manjeri, Kannur Indoor Stadium in Kannur, Lal Bahadur Shastri Stadium in Kollam and many more. All these stadiums attest to the mass appeal of such sports among Keralites.

Association football 

Association football enjoys the most fan following among the sports in the state. Football was introduced to the land of Kerala during pre-independence period by British officers of the Malabar Special Police (MSP) in the 20th century. MSP was camped in Malappuram and soon the natives began adopting the sport, who played in post-harvest paddy fields.

R B Ferguson Club is the oldest football club in Kerala state and one of the oldest clubs in India. The first Indian professional football club FC Kochin was from Kerala. The northern (Malabar region) and middle parts of Kerala, especially Malappuram and Thrissur, are famous for football-crazy. produced many Indian International footballers such as I. M. Vijayan, V. P. Sathyan , C. V. Pappachan, Jo Paul Ancheri, Victor Manjila, E.N. Sudhir and C. A. Liston.

Most of the professional football clubs in India have many Kerala footballers including Indian internationals Mohammed Rafi, C.K. Vineeth, Anas Edathodika, Sahal Abdul Samad, Rino Anto, Rahul Kannoly Praveen, Ashique Kuruniyan, N.P Pradeep,  Krishnan Nair Ajayan, Zakeer Mundampara, Usman Ashik, Muhammed Sagar Ali, Denson Devadas, C. S. Sabeeth, Mohamed Irshad, Asif Kottayil, Sushanth Mathew, and many more.

Sevens
Seven-a-side football, known locally as sevens, is particularly popular in Malabar region of Kerala. Its tournaments runs from November to May. In Kerala, sevens football registers more attendance than regular football. Earlier, it was played in paddy fields. In 1950s, national players who came for the Sait Nagjee Football Tournament in Kozhikode also participated in the local sevens tournament for extra money. Sevens moved to enclosed grounds with ticketed entry by 1970s. As tournaments increased, the Kerala Sevens Football Association (KSFA) was formed in 1983. As of 2019, it has 32 registered clubs, and around 80 tournaments held every year. Around 600 tournaments are held each season if unaffiliated clubs and unregistered tournaments are also counted. Sevens tournaments are known for recruiting foreign players from Africa, mainly from Ghana, Ivory Coast, and Nigeria. Despite the popularity, the Kerala Football Association (KFA) refused to recognise sevens as legitimate football until 2017 and had even banned I. M. Vijayan once for playing sevens. Talking about the issue, C. K. Vineeth said: "We talk about academies, but let me ask you how many top-class footballers have these academies produced? Sevens have an endless number of top footballers. There was a time when Kerala didn't have a single football tournament (11-a-side). It was sevens which kept the game alive". Some of the association football players who started their career in sevens are I. M. Vijayan, Jo Paul Ancheri, V. P. Sathyan, Anas Edathodika, and Ashique Kuruniyan.

Indian Super League

Football became popular in Kerala decades ago. Kochi currently has a club called Kerala Blasters which competes in Indian Super League, one of the India's top football leagues. The Blasters are the most popular football club in Kerala, and one of the most widely supported clubs in the country as well as one of the most followed sports team from Asia in the social media. The club is also the three time runners up of the league.

I-League
Gokulam Kerala represents Kerala in I-League. They went on to play in the I league for the first time in the  2017–18 I-League. Gokulam Kerala played all their matches in the EMS Stadium which is located in the heart of Kozhikode city. The West stand was the largest and could accommodate the maximum number of people. The EMS Stadium was a 53,000 capacity football stadium. Although the club did not have a good beginning, they went on to defeat big clubs in the I-league like East Bengal, Mohun Bagan and Punjab FC by the end of the season. Travancore Royals FC from capital city Trivandrum is first fans owned football club in India.

Kerala Premier League
Kerala Premier League is a football league organised by Kerala Football Association played in the state of Kerala, India. It was founded in 2013, competed by 10 football clubs from the state.

Hockey
 
Hockey is the pride game of city of Kollam and Kollam district. There are a lot number of Kollam city based players in Indian hockey team as well as Kerala Hockey Team.

Kollam is famous for its players and the passion for the game. So to support the city's passion towards hockey, Government of Kerala have built a most modern state of the type astro turf hockey stadium within the city, which is first of its kind in the state. International Hockey Stadium in Kollam is having a total seating capacity of 5,000 built at a cost of Rs.17.55 Crores (US$2.84 Million). The stadium is now the home-ground of Kerala Hockey Team. Comparing to other sports, hockey is not much popular in Kerala. But the most popular hockey player from Kerala is P R Sreejesh. He has captained Indian team on several occasions.

Athletics 

Kerala has a rich history of producing world class athletes. Athletes like T. C. Yohannan, Suresh Babu, P.T.Usha, Shiny Wilson, K. M. Beenamol, Tintu Lukka, Anju Bobby George, Preeja Sreedharan, Renjith Maheshwary are amongst the best Kerala has produced.

Volleyball 

Volleyball, another popular sport, is often played on makeshift courts on sandy beaches along the coast. Jimmy George, born in Peravoor, Kannur, was arguably the most successful volleyball player ever to represent India.  At his prime he was regarded as among the world's ten best players.

Cricket 
In 1800, commander Arthur Wellesley, 1st Duke of Wellington of British East India Company made Thalassery (then Tellicherry) his administrative base. Wellesley and his colleagues used to play cricket in nearby ground. The local natives engaged as substitute players whenever the English officers were short of players. The locals were from the dhobi community and fishermen who lived along the beach. As a child, Colin Cowdrey played in Thalasserry. In 1830, the Tellicherry Cricket Club (TCC) was formed. The earliest record of a match in Thalassery is a report from Malayala Manorama of 1890, about a match between Thalassery and Kannur. By the 1930s, Thalassery had become a cricket hub, attracting teams from other states. During World War I (1914 – 1918), an exhibition match was conducted in Thalasserry for raising funds for the war.

Sreesanth (right-arm fast-medium, played 26 tests and 53 ODIs for India) is often regarded as the most successful cricketer from Kerala. Tinu Yohannan, son of Olympic long jumper T. C. Yohannan, also represented India, 3 times in tests and ODIs and Sanju Samson, a future Indian batsman, who already joined Indian team. K. N. Ananthapadmanabhan (344 first class wickets) is also a famous domestic cricket from Kerala, who took 344 wickets in first class cricket. Kochi Tuskers, a short lived former Indian Premier League team, represented Kochi, Kerala. Sports Hub Trivandrum and Jawaharlal Nehru International Stadium (Kaloor International Stadium) are the two international cricket stadiums in Kerala.

Water-Polo 
Kerala is considered one of the best Indian states regarding water-polo. Malayalee clubs, teams, players, both women and men, are some of the most valuable in India, winning several national championships.

Traditional sports

Vallam kali
Vallam kali is a boat race in the backwaters of Kerala. It is a form of canoe racing, and uses paddled war canoes. It is mainly conducted during the season of the Onam in spring. Vallam kali includes races of many kinds of paddled longboats and 'snake boats'.

Gatta gusthi
Gatta gusthi is a form of submission wrestling native to Kerala. It is competed inside an open ring on  ground known as godha, usually on a beach; wrestlers are called phayalvans. The sport comprises around 100 techniques. Gatta gusthi was popular in the state until late 1960s with the arrival of freestyle wrestling and karate. The freestyle form is known simply as gusthi.

Nadan Panthu kali
Nadan panthu kali is a team sport played in rural villages of Kottayam district and Muvattupuzha Taluk. Villages like Manaracd, Puthuppally, Thottakkadu, Thirvanchoor, Meendam, Manganam, Kurichy, Valakom etc. are the places where this game is played. This game is played using a small ball made of leather and filled with cotton or coconut fibre. Each team consist of 7 players each. The game is played for six Innings (vara). Each inning, both the teams are allowed to do "vettu" where they initiate the scoring and other team prevents from the scoring. Scoring points follow the sequence like otta, petta, pidiyan, thalm, Keezhu, Indan and then it repeats. The team which score the most points from the innings wins. Annual Tournaments are conducted at these villages every year.

List of Stadiums in Kerala

The following is a list of major stadiums in Kerala in the order of  their capacity.

References

External links 
Kalaripayattu - one of the oldest martial arts, Government of Kerala website
 FootballKerala.com Kerala Football News 

Sport in Kerala